Hugh Morrison may refer to:

 Hugh Morrison (Manitoba politician) (1892–1957), Progressive Conservative member of the Legislative Assembly of Manitoba 1936–1957
 Hugh Morrison (English politician) (1868–1931), British Conservative Party Member of Parliament 1918–1923, 1924–1931
 Hugh Morrison (Northern Ireland politician), MP in the Northern Ireland Parliament for Queen's University of Belfast
 Hugh Morrison (golfer) (fl. 1875), Scottish golfer